This is a list of all transactions occurring in the 1984-85 NBA season.

Events

July ?, 1984
The San Antonio Spurs waived Brant Weidner.

July 10, 1984
The Kansas City Kings waived Dave Robisch.

July 11, 1984
The Atlanta Hawks signed Walker Russell as a free agent.

July 25, 1984
The Denver Nuggets waived Anthony Roberts.
The Portland Trail Blazers signed Tom Scheffler as a free agent.

July 26, 1984
The Cleveland Cavaliers hired George Karl as head coach.

August ?, 1984
The New York Knicks signed Ron Cavenall as a free agent.

August 1, 1984
The New York Knicks signed Clinton Wheeler as a free agent.

August 3, 1984
The Denver Nuggets signed Elston Turner as a veteran free agent and sent Howard Carter to the Dallas Mavericks as compensation.

August 8, 1984
The Atlanta Hawks traded Johnny Davis to the Cleveland Cavaliers for John Garris and Stewart Granger.

August 10, 1984
The Houston Rockets traded Caldwell Jones to the Chicago Bulls for Mitchell Wiggins, a 1985 2nd round draft pick (Tyrone Corbin was later selected) and a 1985 3rd round draft pick (Michael Payne was later selected).

August 24, 1984
The New York Knicks waived Clinton Wheeler.

September ?, 1984
The Cleveland Cavaliers signed Dale Wilkinson as a free agent.
The Utah Jazz waived Jim Rowinski.

September 7, 1984
The Golden State Warriors signed Chuck Aleksinas as a free agent.

September 9, 1984
The Golden State Warriors signed Peter Thibeaux as a free agent.

September 11, 1984
The San Antonio Spurs waived Charles Jones.

September 14, 1984
The Chicago Bulls traded Wallace Bryant to the Dallas Mavericks for a 1986 2nd round draft pick (Rafael Addison was later selected).
The Philadelphia 76ers traded Leo Rautins to the Indiana Pacers for a 1987 3rd round draft pick (Hansi Gnad was later selected).

September 15, 1984
The Los Angeles Lakers signed Chuck Nevitt as a free agent.

September 17, 1984
The Indiana Pacers traded Kevin McKenna to the Houston Rockets for a 1985 5th round draft pick (Ivan Daniels was later selected).

September 20, 1984
The Chicago Bulls signed Charles Jones as a free agent.

September 21, 1984
The Seattle SuperSonics signed John Schweitz as a free agent.

September 23, 1984
The Seattle SuperSonics signed Frank Brickowski as a free agent.

September 24, 1984
Bob Lanier retired from the Milwaukee Bucks
The Phoenix Suns signed Mike Holton as a free agent.
The Seattle SuperSonics waived Steve Hayes.

September 25, 1984
The Washington Bullets traded Bryan Warrick to the Los Angeles Clippers for a 1985 3rd round draft pick (Ken Perry was later selected).

September 26, 1984
The Portland Trail Blazers waived Tom Piotrowski.
The Houston Rockets signed Lionel Hollins as a veteran free agent.

September 27, 1984
The Washington Bullets signed Dudley Bradley as a free agent.
The New Jersey Nets signed George Johnson as a veteran free agent.
The Cleveland Cavaliers signed Robert Smith as a free agent.
The Chicago Bulls signed Dirk Minniefield as a free agent.

September 28, 1984
The Utah Jazz signed Billy Paultz as a veteran free agent and sent a 1985 3rd round draft pick (Sedric Toney was later selected) to the Atlanta Hawks as compensation.
The Detroit Pistons signed Bobby Cattage as a free agent.
The Indiana Pacers signed Tony Brown as a free agent.

September 29, 1984
The New York Knicks traded Campy Russell to the Cleveland Cavaliers for a 1985 2nd round draft pick. The 2nd round draft pick was contingent upon Russell being on Cleveland's roster on December 1, 1984 but he was waived on November 5, 1984.
The Milwaukee Bucks traded Junior Bridgeman, Harvey Catchings, Marques Johnson and cash to the Los Angeles Clippers for Terry Cummings, Craig Hodges and Ricky Pierce.

October 4, 1984
The Houston Rockets traded James Bailey and a 1985 2nd round draft pick (Tyrone Corbin was later selected) to the San Antonio Spurs for John Lucas and a 1985 3rd round draft pick (Sam Mitchell was later selected).
The Indiana Pacers waived Sidney Lowe.

October 8, 1984
The Detroit Pistons waived Jerome Henderson.
The Kansas City Kings waived Carl Henry.

October 10, 1984
The Philadelphia 76ers waived Butch Graves.
The Phoenix Suns waived Michael Young.

October 11, 1984
The Utah Jazz waived Jerry Eaves.

October 12, 1984
The Detroit Pistons signed Sidney Lowe as a free agent.
The Milwaukee Bucks signed Butch Graves as a free agent.

October 15, 1984
The Atlanta Hawks signed Leo Rautins as a free agent.
The Atlanta Hawks signed Jerry Eaves as a free agent.
The Kansas City Kings waived Larry Micheaux.
The Indiana Pacers waived Brook Steppe.
The Golden State Warriors waived Pace Mannion.
The San Antonio Spurs waived Joe Binion.

October 16, 1984
The Boston Celtics traded Gerald Henderson to the Seattle SuperSonics for a 1986 1st round draft pick (Len Bias was later selected).

October 17, 1984
The Milwaukee Bucks signed Larry Micheaux as a free agent.

October 18, 1984
The Detroit Pistons waived Bobby Cattage.

October 19, 1984
The Indiana Pacers traded Butch Carter to the New York Knicks for a 1985 2nd round draft pick (Dwayne McClain was later selected).

October 22, 1984
The Dallas Mavericks traded Bill Garnett and Terence Stansbury to the Indiana Pacers for a 1990 1st round draft pick (Travis Mays was later selected).
The Cleveland Cavaliers waived Dale Wilkinson.
The Milwaukee Bucks waived Butch Graves.
The Chicago Bulls waived Dirk Minniefield.

October 23, 1984
The Portland Trail Blazers waived Pete Verhoeven.
The Dallas Mavericks waived Mark West.
The Houston Rockets waived Major Jones.
The Houston Rockets waived Terry Teagle.
The Houston Rockets waived Kevin McKenna.
The Golden State Warriors waived Chris Engler.
The Golden State Warriors waived Don Collins.
The Milwaukee Bucks waived McKinley Singleton.
The Detroit Pistons waived Ray Tolbert.

October 24, 1984
The Detroit Pistons signed Dale Wilkinson as a free agent.
The San Antonio Spurs traded James Bailey to the New York Knicks for a 1986 3rd round draft pick (Forrest McKenzie was later selected).
The Utah Jazz waived David Pope.
The Indiana Pacers waived Kenton Edelin.

October 25, 1984
The Washington Bullets waived Joe Kopicki.
The Boston Celtics waived Michael Young.

October 26, 1984
The Chicago Bulls signed Wes Matthews as a free agent.

October 29, 1984
The Los Angeles Clippers traded Hank McDowell to the Houston Rockets for a 1985 3rd round draft pick (Ken Perry was later selected).

October 31, 1984
The Denver Nuggets signed Joe Kopicki as a free agent.
The Atlanta Hawks waived Jerry Eaves.

November 2, 1984
The Kansas City Kings signed Pete Verhoeven as a free agent.

November 5, 1984
The Atlanta Hawks waived Leo Rautins.
The Milwaukee Bucks waived Lorenzo Romar.
The Cleveland Cavaliers waived Campy Russell.

November 6, 1984
The Milwaukee Bucks signed Mark West as a free agent.
The Washington Bullets waived Charles Davis.
The Los Angeles Lakers waived Chuck Nevitt.
The Detroit Pistons waived Dale Wilkinson.

November 7, 1984
The Detroit Pistons signed Major Jones as a free agent.
The Detroit Pistons signed Terry Teagle as a free agent.

November 8, 1984
The Detroit Pistons signed Lorenzo Romar as a free agent.
The Utah Jazz waived Kenny Natt.

November 9, 1984
The Indiana Pacers waived Ralph Jackson.

November 11, 1984
The Milwaukee Bucks signed Charles Davis as a free agent.
The Detroit Pistons waived Sidney Lowe.

November 12, 1984
The Milwaukee Bucks waived Mark West.

November 13, 1984
The Seattle SuperSonics waived Scooter McCray.

November 14, 1984
The New Jersey Nets signed Tom LaGarde as a free agent.

November 16, 1984
The Cleveland Cavaliers claimed Michael Wilson on waivers from the Washington Bullets.
The Chicago Bulls waived Ronnie Lester.
The Chicago Bulls waived Charles Jones.

November 18, 1984
Jack McKinney resigns as head coach for the Kansas City Kings.
The Kansas City Kings hired Phil Johnson as head coach.

November 20, 1984
The Detroit Pistons waived Terry Teagle.

November 23, 1984
The Cleveland Cavaliers signed Mark West as a free agent.

November 24, 1984
The Detroit Pistons signed Brook Steppe as a free agent.

November 26, 1984
The Cleveland Cavaliers waived Robert Smith.

November 27, 1984
The Detroit Pistons waived Lorenzo Romar.
The Phoenix Suns signed Michael Young as a free agent.

November 28, 1984
The Los Angeles Lakers signed Ronnie Lester as a free agent.
The Atlanta Hawks signed Sidney Lowe as a free agent.

November 29, 1984
The Detroit Pistons waived David Thirdkill.

December 5, 1984
The San Antonio Spurs waived Ron Brewer.

December 6, 1984
The Kansas City Kings waived Dane Suttle.

December 7, 1984
The Cleveland Cavaliers waived Geoff Huston.

December 8, 1984
The Kansas City Kings signed David Pope as a free agent.

December 10, 1984
The Utah Jazz waived John Drew.
The New Jersey Nets signed Kevin McKenna as a free agent.

December 11, 1984
The Kansas City Kings traded Billy Knight to the San Antonio Spurs for Mark McNamara.

December 14, 1984
The Cleveland Cavaliers traded Jeff Cook to the San Antonio Spurs for Edgar Jones and cash.
The Kansas City Kings signed Kenny Natt as a free agent.
The Cleveland Cavaliers waived Michael Wilson.

December 15, 1984
The Philadelphia 76ers signed George Johnson as a veteran free agent and sent a 1989 2nd round draft pick (Reggie Cross was later selected) to the Indiana Pacers as compensation.
The Philadelphia 76ers traded Marc Iavaroni to the San Antonio Spurs for a 1986 3rd round draft pick (Keith Colbert was later selected).

December 17, 1984
The Dallas Mavericks waived Howard Carter.
The Kansas City Kings waived Kenny Natt.
The Milwaukee Bucks waived Larry Micheaux.

December 18, 1984
The Houston Rockets waived Phil Ford.
The New Jersey Nets waived Tom LaGarde.
The San Antonio Spurs traded Fred Roberts to the Utah Jazz for a 1986 2nd round draft pick (Lemone Lampley was later selected) and a 1988 2nd round draft pick (Jeff Moe was later selected).
The Atlanta Hawks waived Sidney Lowe.
The Atlanta Hawks waived Walker Russell.

December 19, 1984
The Kansas City Kings signed Kenny Natt to a 10-day contract.

December 20, 1984
The Atlanta Hawks signed Sidney Lowe to the first of two 10-day contracts.
The Cleveland Cavaliers signed Kevin Williams as a free agent.

December 22, 1984
The New Jersey Nets signed Chris Engler as a free agent.
The Utah Jazz signed Pace Mannion as a free agent.

December 26, 1984
The New Jersey Nets signed Michael Wilson as a free agent.

December 28, 1984
The Houston Rockets signed Larry Micheaux as a free agent.

January 10, 1985
The Cleveland Cavaliers signed Butch Graves to the first of two 10-day contracts.
The Indiana Pacers signed Kenton Edelin to a 10-day contract.

January 14, 1985
The Chicago Bulls signed Chris Engler to the first of two 10-day contracts.

February 12, 1985
The Milwaukee Bucks signed David Thirdkill to the first of two 10-day contracts.
The Cleveland Cavaliers traded Paul Thompson to the Milwaukee Bucks for a 1985 2nd round draft pick (Hot Rod Williams was later selected) and a 1987 2nd round draft pick (Kannard Johnson was later selected).

February 14, 1985
The Washington Bullets signed Charles Jones as a free agent.
The Atlanta Hawks waived Stewart Granger.

February 18, 1985
The Los Angeles Clippers signed Chris Engler to a 10-day contract.

February 21, 1985
The Boston Celtics signed Ray Williams as a veteran free agent and sent a 1985 2nd round draft pick (Gerald Wilkins was later selected) and a 1986 2nd round draft pick (Michael Jackson was later selected) to the New York Knicks as compensation.

February 27, 1985
The Kansas City Kings signed Ed Nealy as a free agent.

March 5, 1985
The Los Angeles Lakers signed Chuck Nevitt as a free agent.

March 6, 1985
The Milwaukee Bucks waived David Thirdkill.

March 8, 1985
The Los Angeles Clippers waived Bryan Warrick.

March 10, 1985
The Los Angeles Clippers signed Franklin Edwards as a veteran free agent.
The Los Angeles Clippers signed Dale Wilkinson as a free agent.

March 11, 1985
The Golden State Warriors signed Terry Teagle as a free agent.

March 13, 1985
The Washington Bullets signed Don Collins as a free agent.

March 19, 1985
The Philadelphia 76ers signed Steve Hayes as a free agent.

March 21, 1985
The New Jersey Nets signed Ron Brewer as a free agent.

March 25, 1985
The Indiana Pacers signed Greg Kelser as a veteran free agent.

March 29, 1985
The Indiana Pacers signed Kenton Edelin as a free agent.

April 2, 1985
The Milwaukee Bucks signed Chris Engler as a free agent.

April 7, 1985
The Philadelphia 76ers waived Steve Hayes.

April 9, 1985
The San Antonio Spurs signed David Thirdkill as a free agent.

April 11, 1985
The Seattle SuperSonics signed Joe Cooper to a contract for the rest of the season.

April 12, 1985
The San Antonio Spurs signed Linton Townes as a free agent.

April 25, 1985
The Seattle SuperSonics fired Lenny Wilkens as head coach.

May 1, 1985
The Dallas Mavericks traded a 1985 1st round draft pick (Sam Vincent was later selected) to the Boston Celtics for a 1985 1st round draft pick (Terry Porter was later selected) and a 1988 2nd round draft pick (Jose Vargas was later selected).
The Washington Bullets waived Don Collins.

May 8, 1985
The Dallas Mavericks waived Tom Sluby.

May 23, 1985
The Utah Jazz signed Steve Hayes as a free agent.

May 25, 1985
The Chicago Bulls fired Kevin Loughery as head coach.

May 28, 1985
Billy Cunningham resigns as head coach for Philadelphia 76ers.

June 6, 1985
The Detroit Pistons signed Jerome Henderson as a free agent.

June 13, 1985
Stan Albeck resigns as head coach for the New Jersey Nets.

June 14, 1985
The Philadelphia 76ers hired Matt Guokas as head coach.
The Portland Trail Blazers traded Bernard Thompson to the Phoenix Suns for a 1987 2nd round draft pick (Nikita Wilson was later selected).

June 17, 1985
The Chicago Bulls hired Stan Albeck as head coach.
The Washington Bullets traded Greg Ballard to the Golden State Warriors for a 1985 2nd round draft pick (Manute Bol was later selected) and a 1987 2nd round draft pick (Duane Washington was later selected).
The Washington Bullets traded Mike Gibson and Rick Mahorn to the Detroit Pistons for Dan Roundfield.

June 18, 1985
The San Antonio Spurs traded Gene Banks to the Chicago Bulls for Steve Johnson and a 1985 2nd round draft pick (Mike Brittain was later selected).
The Chicago Bulls traded Keith Lee and Ennis Whatley to the Cleveland Cavaliers for Charles Oakley and Calvin Duncan.
The Portland Trail Blazers traded Mike Smrek to the Chicago Bulls for Ben Coleman and Ken Johnson.

June 19, 1985
The San Antonio Spurs waived Billy Knight.

June 25, 1985
The Seattle SuperSonics hired Bernie Bickerstaff as head coach.

External links
Basketball.RealGM.com
Basketball-Reference.com

References

Transactions
1984–85